Laura Victoria Jones (born 12 June 1992 in Nottingham, England) is a British gymnast selected for the Great Britain team at the 2008 Summer Olympic Games but had to drop out due to injury, to be replaced by Imogen Cairns.

Jones achievements include:

2006: placed 3rd in the all-around at the Junior British championships
2006: placed 4th on beam at the Junior European Championships
First British gymnast to compete a punch front half
Only British gymnast to currently compete a triple twist dismount

References

1992 births
Living people
British female artistic gymnasts
21st-century British women